Laos–Pakistan relations are bilateral relations between Laos and Pakistan.

High level visits
In 2004, Pakistan Prime Minister Zafarullah Jamali visited Laos on an invitation of PM Bounnhang Vorachith of Laos, both countries reaffirmed their commitment to implement the purpose and principles of the UN charter in their bilateral relations and to contribute to peaceful settlement of conflicts and disputes around the globe.
Pakistan Prime Minister Raja Pervez Ashraf visited Laos in 2012 to attend ASEM meeting.

Trade
Pakistan and Laos have an annual trade of approximately 10 million US dollars.

Education
Many Laos students are currently studying in Pakistani universities.

Resident of diplomatic missions 
  is represented in Pakistan through its embassy in Beijing. 
  is represented in Laos  through its embassy in Bangkok.

See also 
 Foreign relations of Laos 
 Foreign relations of Pakistan

References

Laos
Pakistan